Member of the Jury is a 1937 British crime film directed by Bernard Mainwaring and starring Ellis Irving, Marjorie Hume and Franklyn Bellamy. The screenplay concerns a man who tries to clear his employer of suspicion of murder.

Cast
 Ellis Irving - Walter Maitland 
 Marjorie Hume - Mary Maitland 
 Franklyn Bellamy - Sir John Sloane 
 Arnold Lucy - Uncle 
 Roy Russell - Attorney General 
 Aubrey Pollock - Defence 
 W.E. Holloway - Judge

References

External links

1937 films
1937 crime films
1930s English-language films
Films directed by Bernard Mainwaring
20th Century Fox films
British black-and-white films
British crime films
1930s British films